Sidonia or Sidonie is a feminine given name which may refer to:

People 
 Sidonie of Bavaria (1488–1505), eldest daughter of Duke Albert IV of Bavaria-Munich, wife of the Elector Palatine Louis V
 Sidonie of Poděbrady (1449–1510), daughter of the King of Bohemia
 Sidonie of Saxony (1518–1575), Duchess of Brunswick-Lüneburg and Princess of Calenberg-Göttingen
 Sidonia von Borcke (1548–1620), Pomeranian noblewoman tried and executed for witchcraft
 Sidonia Făgărășan, Romanian biological scientist
 Sidonie Goossens (1899–2004), English harpist
 Sidonie Grünwald-Zerkowitz (1852–1907), Austro-Hungarian writer, translator and fashion designer
 Sidonia Jędrzejewska (born 1975), Polish politician and MEP
 Sidonia Hedwig Zäunemann (1711–1740), German poet

Fictional characters 
 Sidonia, a legendary Jewish priest's daughter (see Abiathar and Sidonia)
 Sidonia of Brittany, heroine of the medieval roman Pontus and Sidonia
 Sidonie, in the 1874 French novel Fromont and Risler, also titled Sidonie
 Sidonie, in the 1686 opera Armide by Jean-Baptiste Lully
 Sidonie, in the 1777 opera Armide by Christoph Willibald Gluck, using the libretto of the earlier opera
 Sidonia, in Benjamin D'Israeli's novel Coningsby
 Tante Sidonia, in Willy Vandersteen's comics series Spike and Suzy
 Sidonia, heroine of Radclyffe Hall's novel A Saturday Life
 Sidonie, a key character in the films The Bitter Tears of Petra von Kant (Germany, 1972) and Peter Von Kant (France, 2022).

See also
 Sidonius (disambiguation)
 Sidonie-Gabrielle Colette (1873–1954), French novelist and performer
 Knights of Sidonia, a Japanese manga and anime series.

Feminine given names